The Play-offs of the 2008 Fed Cup Americas Zone Group I were the final stages of the Group I Zonal Competition involving teams from the Americas. Using the positions determined in their pools, the seven teams faced off to determine their placing in the 2008 Fed Cup Americas Zone Group I. The team that ended up placing first overall advanced to World Group II play-offs, whilst those coming in sixth and seventh were relegated down to Group II for the next year.

Promotion play-offs
The top team of each pool was placed against each other in a head-to-head round. The winner of the round advanced to World Group II for next year.

Brazil vs. Colombia

Third to Fourth play-off
The second placed teams of each pool were placed against each other in a ties. The winner of the tie was allocated third place in the Group while the loser was allocated fourth.

Puerto Rico vs. Canada

Relegation play-offs
Because there was one extra player in Pool A, the last-placed team of that pool was automatically relegated down to Group II. The third-placed teams of each pool were then placed against each other in a tie, where the losing team would join the Uruguayans in relegation.

Paraguay vs. Mexico

Final Placements

  advanced to the World Group II Play-offs, and were drawn against , where they lost 0–5. The team thus fell back to Group I for the next year.
The Mexicans placed second in their pool of four, while the Uruguayans did not compete.

See also
Fed Cup structure

References

External links
 Fed Cup website

2008 Fed Cup Americas Zone